Vostochny is a rural locality (a village) in Kazadayevsky Selsoviet, Sterlitamaksky District, Bashkortostan, Russia. The population was 17 as of 2010. There is 1 street.

Geography 
Vostochny is located 17 km north of Sterlitamak (the district's administrative centre) by road. Staroye Baryatino is the nearest rural locality.

References 

Rural localities in Sterlitamaksky District